Gibberula pulchella is a species of sea snail, a marine gastropod mollusk, in the family Cystiscidae.

References

pulchella
Gastropods described in 1834
Cystiscidae